Alfred W. Moellering (December 13, 1926 – June 2, 2013) was an American lawyer and judge who was the United States Attorney for the Northern District of Indiana under three presidents.

Biography
Alfred Moellering was born on December 13, 1926, in Fort Wayne, Indiana to William and Hilda Moellering. He graduated from South Side High School in 1945 which was followed by his enrollment in the US army. He was a World War II Army veteran and stayed in the army until 1947. He then went on to Indiana School of Business in 1951 and Indiana University School of Law in 1953. He was a member of St. Paul's Lutheran Church. He was appointed United States Attorney for the Northern District of Indiana by President Kennedy in 1962 and served in that position until 1970. He then was elected Superior Court Judge in 1971 and retired from the bench in 1991 after 20 years.

References

1926 births
2013 deaths
20th-century American judges
20th-century American lawyers
Indiana Democrats
Indiana lawyers
United States Attorneys for the Northern District of Indiana
American Lutherans
United States Army personnel of World War II
20th-century Lutherans